David Ackles is the self-titled debut album of American singer-songwriter David Ackles.  Elektra Records later reissued it with new cover art under the title The Road to Cairo. Described by music historian Richie Unterberger as Ackles' "most rock-oriented record", it garnered faint praise from Rolling Stone critic Arthur Schmidt, who complained of thin melodies but who nevertheless described Ackles as "one of the best singers I've ever heard".

Julie Driscoll, Brian Auger and the Trinity covered "The Road to Cairo" shortly after the album's release.  In the early-1970s, Spooky Tooth and The Hollies would cover "Down River."

Track listing
All songs composed by David Ackles.
"The Road to Cairo" – 5:16
"When Love is Gone" – 3:20
"Sonny Come Home" – 2:59
"Blue Ribbons" – 4:37
"What a Happy Day" – 2:14
"Down River" – 3:57
"Laissez-Faire" – 1:36
"Lotus Man" – 2:49
"His Name Is Andrew" – 6:11
"Be My Friend" – 4:48

Personnel
David Ackles – piano, vocals
Danny Weis – guitar
Douglas Hastings – guitar
Jerry Penrod – bass guitar
Michael Fonfara – organ 
Jon Keliehor – percussion
Technical
Bruce Botnick, Brain Ross-Myring – engineer
Bob Fisher – audio mastering
Joel Brodsky – photography
William S. Harvey – art direction, cover art concept, cover art
Richie Unterberger – liner notes

References

1968 debut albums
David Ackles albums
Elektra Records albums
Albums produced by David Anderle
Albums with cover art by Joel Brodsky